Trust signals are evidence points that appear online to help customers feel more secure in their decision to purchase from a business or buy a product or service.

Trust signals were described in an article published in the March 2000 edition of the Journal of Computer-Mediated Communication as trust badges or seals from organizations such as the Better Business Bureau and TrustArc on e-commerce websites. At that time, consumers were more skeptical of providing their credit card information and other personal details to a website; trust signals helped visitors overcome their fears.

In current internet marketing parlance, trust signals fall into three major categories:

 Trust signals that encourage visitors to complete a purchase or take an action;
 Trust signals elsewhere online that drive visitors to a website; and
 Trust signals that visitors might not notice, but that Google uses for ranking.

A 2019 neuroimaging study in the Journal of Interactive Marketing studied 29 subjects who participated in an experiment simulating an online purchase. The analysis revealed that seals of approval from third-party organizations were most trusted, whereas rating systems were less trusted because they elicited feelings of ambiguity and risk.

See also
 Privacy seal
 Trustmark (commerce)
 Trust seal

References

E-commerce
Marketing strategy